Klas Fleming may refer to:

 Klaus Fleming (Clas Eriksson Fleming 1535–1597), Finnish-Swedish admiral
  (c. 1550–1616), soldier and historian
 Clas Larsson Fleming (1592–1644), admiral and administrator of the Royal Swedish Navy
  (1649–1685), Governor of Örebro (1680–1681)
 Claes Adolph Fleming (1771–1831), Swedish count and member of the Swedish Academy
 HSwMS Clas Fleming, a Swedish Navy mine cruiser

See also
 Fleming of Louhisaari, about the family